Live at the Old Waldorf is a live album by Television that was recorded on 29 June 1978 at the Old Waldorf, San Francisco, on their last American tour until their 1992 reunion. The show was from a radio show broadcast that was a popular bootleg until its official release by Rhino Handmade in 2003.

Track listing
All tracks composed by Tom Verlaine except where indicated.

2003 Rhino Handmade Limited Edition CD Release (5000 copies)
 "The Dream's Dream"
 "Venus"
 "Foxhole"
 "Careful"
 "Ain't that Nothin'"
 "Little Johnny Jewel"
 "Friction"
 "Marquee Moon"
 "(I Can't Get No) Satisfaction" (Mick Jagger, Keith Richards)

2011 Rhino Vinyl Limited Edition 2 LP White Vinyl Release (3000 copies)
Side One
 "The Dream's Dream"
 "Venus"
 "Foxhole"
 "Careful"

Side Two
 "Ain't that Nothin'"
 "Little Johnny Jewel"

Side Three
 "Friction"
 "Marquee Moon"

Side Four
 "(I Can't Get No) Satisfaction" (Mick Jagger, Keith Richards)

Personnel
Television
Tom Verlaine - vocals, guitar
Richard Lloyd - guitar, vocals
Fred Smith - bass, vocals
Billy Ficca - drums

References

Television (band) albums
1978 live albums
Rhino Handmade live albums